Stavros Stathakis (born 30 November 1987) is a Greek footballer who plays as a defender.

Career

PAE Thraki
Born in Alexandroupoli, Stathakis began his football career with PAE Thraki. In three seasons, he managed to play in 54 games with 9 goals, playing either as a defender or as a midfielder.

Skoda Xanthi
After three years, he earned a transfer to Skoda Xanthi. Although he had the confidence of his coach, he failed to convince the club, so the 2012-13 season was loaned to the Cypriot club Enosis Neon Paralimni.

AEK Athens
At June 2013, he left Xanthi as free agent, and signed for AEK Athens for four years. At his debut, he scored a surprising goal with a 50-yard shoot and AEK's first goal for the 2013-14 season and for Football League 2. His contract was terminated on 3 July 2014.

Honours
AEK Athens
Football League 2: 1
 2014(6th Group)

References

External links
 
 Guardian Football
 Aekfc.gr Profile
 Myplayer.gr Profile

1987 births
Living people
Footballers from Alexandroupolis
Greek footballers
Football League (Greece) players
Cypriot First Division players
Xanthi F.C. players
Enosis Neon Paralimni FC players
AEK Athens F.C. players
Athlitiki Enosi Larissa F.C. players
Ayia Napa FC players
Association football defenders
Association football utility players
Greek expatriate footballers
Expatriate footballers in Cyprus